The Basilica of the Heart of Jesus is a Roman Catholic basilica located in Palmotićeva street of Zagreb, Croatia. It is dedicated to the Sacred Heart, and was designed by the Croatian architect  in the neo-Baroque style.

The Basilica of the Heart of Jesus is the second largest church in Zagreb, after the Zagreb Cathedral. It is used by the Jesuits.

History
The construction of the church is tied to the arrival of Jesuits in Zagreb in 1855. For this purpose, the archbishop Juraj Haulik gave a sum of 60,000 florins in 1860. However, political and economic conditions were not favorable for Haulik's idea, and it was revived four decades later by archbishop Juraj Posilović, who donated an additional sum of 12,000 florins. In 1898, a land parcel was bought for the construction of the church in the Palmotićeva street in the Lower town of Zagreb. The basilica of Heart of Jesus was finished and consecrated in 1902, with the construction itself taking slightly over a year. In 1941, the church received the status of minor basilica.

The church was heavily damaged in the 2020 Zagreb earthquake.

See also
 List of Jesuit sites

References

Sources

External links

  

Religious buildings and structures in Zagreb
Basilica churches in Croatia
Roman Catholic churches completed in 1902
Donji grad, Zagreb
20th-century Roman Catholic church buildings in Croatia